Shunlin Liang is an aerospace engineer at the University of Maryland, College Park. He was named a Fellow of the Institute of Electrical and Electronics Engineers (IEEE) in 2013 for his contributions to remote sensing from satellite observations.

Liang received the Ph.D. degree in remote sensing and GIS from Boston University.

References 

Fellow Members of the IEEE
Living people
University of Maryland, College Park faculty
Chinese engineers
21st-century American engineers
Boston University College of Engineering alumni
Year of birth missing (living people)
American electrical engineers